The 2013 Women's International Match Racing Series was a series of match racing sailing regattas staged during 2013 season.

Regattas

Standings

References

External links
 Official website

2013
2013 in sailing